Varicoturris is a genus of predatory air-breathing land snails, terrestrial pulmonate gastropod mollusks in the family Spiraxidae.

Distribution 
The distribution of the genus Varicoturris includes Mexico and Guatemala.

Species 
There are five species within two subgenera in the genus Varicoturris:

Subgenus Vericoturris Pilsbry, 1907
 Varicoturris dubia (Pfeiffer, 1856)
 Varicoturris flammulata (H. B. Baker, 1941)
 Varicoturris huehuetenangoensis (Thompson, 1995)
 Varicoturris pycnoptyx (Thompson, 1995)

Subgenus Streptostylella Pilsbry, 1908
 Varicoturris botteriana (Crosse & Fischer, 1869)

References 

Spiraxidae